Davis Milton Love III (born April 13, 1964) is an American professional golfer who has won 21 events on the PGA Tour, including one major championship: the 1997 PGA Championship. He won the Players Championship in 1992 and 2003. He was in the top 10 of the Official World Golf Ranking for over 450 weeks, reaching a high ranking of 2nd.  He captained the U.S. Ryder Cup teams in 2012 and 2016. Love was inducted into the World Golf Hall of Fame in 2017.

Background and family
Davis Milton Love III was born on April 13, 1964 in Charlotte, North Carolina to Davis Love Jr. and his wife, Helen, a day after his father competed in the final round at the 1964 Masters Tournament. His father, who was a former pro and nationally recognized golf instructor, introduced him to the game. His mother is also an avid low-handicap golfer. His father was killed in a 1988 plane crash.

Love attended high school in Brunswick, Georgia, and graduated from its Glynn Academy in 1982. He played college golf at the University of North Carolina in Chapel Hill, where he was a three-time All-American and all-Atlantic Coast Conference. He won six titles during his collegiate career, including the ACC tournament championship as a sophomore in 1984.

Love is a Republican, and has donated money to Johnny Isakson and George W Bush.

Professional career
Love turned professional in 1985, earning his PGA Tour card in the autumn of 1985, on his first attempt. He quickly established himself on the PGA Tour, winning his first tour event in 1987 at the MCI Heritage Golf Classic, at Harbour Town Golf Links. He would later win this event four more times, setting a record for the most victories in the tournament. Love and Fred Couples won four straight times from 1992 to 1995 for the United States in the World Cup of Golf, a record for this event.

Love was a consistent contender and winner on the PGA Tour in the 1990s and early 2000s, but the most memorable win came at the 1997 PGA Championship, his only major championship victory. It was played at Winged Foot Golf Club near New York City, and just four players in the field finished under-par for the week.  Love's winning score was 11-under-par, five strokes better than runner-up Justin Leonard. When Love sank his birdie putt on the final hole of the championship, it was under the arc of a rainbow, which appeared as he walked up to the 18th green. In the telecast, CBS Sports announcer Jim Nantz made the connection between the rainbow and Love's late father, Davis Love Jr., who was a well-known and beloved figure in the golf world. This victory was the last major championship win achieved with a wooden-headed driver.

In 1994, Love founded Love Golf Design, a golf course architecture company with his younger brother and caddie, Mark Love. The company has been responsible for the design of several courses throughout the southeast United States. Completed in 1997, Ocean Creek is his first signature course and is located on Fripp Island, South Carolina. Love also designed the Dunes course at Diamante in Cabo San Lucas, Mexico, which is ranked among Golf Magazines Top 100 courses in the world.

In 1997, Love published the book Every Shot I Take, which honors his father's lessons on life and golf, and it received the United States Golf Association's International Book Award.  That year, he developed and designed his own golf course in Harnett County, North Carolina. The course, Anderson Creek Club, won an award for "Best New Course in North Carolina" in 2001. He and his wife Robin have two children.

On November 9, 2008, Love earned his 20th PGA Tour win at the Children's Miracle Network Classic, which gave him a lifetime exemption on Tour.

In 2012, Love captained the U.S. Team that lost the 2012 Ryder Cup.

Love’s victory in the 2015 Wyndham Championship—at age 51—made him the third-oldest winner in PGA Tour history, trailing only Sam Snead and Art Wall Jr. The win made Love the oldest PGA Tour winner in the PGA Tour Champions era (since 1980). It also brought Love into select company in another PGA Tour distinction: he became only the third player to win on the tour in four different decades, joining Snead and Raymond Floyd.

After failing to qualify for the FedEx Cup in 2014, Love made his Champions Tour debut at the Pacific Links Hawaii Championship.

Love is the tournament host of the RSM Classic. In 2015, son Davis IV (better known as Dru) earned a sponsor exemption into the event, but  missed the cut.

In 2016, Love captained the winning U.S. Team at the 2016 Ryder Cup.

After Davis failed to qualify for the 2017 U.S. Open, he caddied for Dru, who made his professional debut.

On December 16, 2018, Love and his son Dru won the Father/Son Challenge at Ritz-Carlton Golf Club in Orlando, Florida.

For the 2020 PGA Tour season, Love joined CBS as a full-time analyst. In July 2020, Love announced that he was leaving his role with CBS in order to "focus on my family, play a few tournaments, and bring some stability back in a difficult year."

On March 27, 2020, Love's home in St. Simons Island, Georgia, was destroyed in a fire. Love and his wife escaped without injury.

In September 2022, Love captained the U.S. team to victory in the 2022 Presidents Cup at Quail Hollow Club in Charlotte, North Carolina. The U.S. team won 17.5–12.5.

Legacy
 Has a portion of Interstate 95 named after him. In 1998, the segment of I-95 which extends in Georgia from the McIntosh County line to Highway 341 at exit 7A and B was designated the "Davis Love III Highway."
 Love hit the second-longest drive ever officially recorded in competition play at the Mercedes Championships in 2004.  His  drive was still  short of Mike Austin's record.
 He also has a restaurant named after him in his hometown of Sea Island, Georgia, called the Davis Love Grill.

Amateur wins
1984 North and South Amateur, Middle Atlantic Amateur

Professional wins (37)
PGA Tour wins (21)PGA Tour playoff record (2–7)Japan Golf Tour wins (1)

Other wins (15)Other playoff record (1–3)Major championships
Wins (1)

Results timeline
Results not in chronological order in 2020.

CUT = missed the half-way cut
"T" indicates a tie for a place
NT = No tournament due to COVID-19 pandemic

Summary

Most consecutive cuts made – 8 (2001 U.S. Open – 2003 Masters)
Longest streak of top-10s – 3 (1998 Open Championship – 1999 Masters)

The Players Championship
Wins (2)

Results timeline

CUT = missed the halfway cut
DQ = disqualified
"T" indicates a tie for a place.

Results in World Golf Championships
Results not in chronological order before 2015.

1Cancelled due to 9/11

QF, R16, R32, R64 = Round in which player lost in match play
"T" = Tied
WD = Withdrew
NT = No tournament
Note that the HSBC Champions did not become a WGC event until 2009.

PGA Tour career summary

*As of the 2021 season.

U.S. national team appearancesAmateurWalker Cup: 1985 (winners)Professional'
Dunhill Cup: 1992
World Cup: 1992 (winners), 1993 (winners), 1994 (winners), 1995 (winners), 1997
Ryder Cup: 1993 (winners), 1995, 1997, 1999 (winners), 2002, 2004, 2012 (non-playing captain), 2016 (non-playing captain, winners)
Presidents Cup: 1994 (winners), 1996 (winners), 1998, 2000 (winners), 2003 (tie), 2005 (winners), 2022 (non-playing captain, winners)
Wendy's 3-Tour Challenge (representing PGA Tour): 1996 (winners), 1998, 2012 (winners)

See also
1985 PGA Tour Qualifying School graduates
List of golfers with most PGA Tour wins
List of men's major championships winning golfers
List of golfers with most wins in one PGA Tour event

References

External links

American male golfers
North Carolina Tar Heels men's golfers
PGA Tour golfers
PGA Tour Champions golfers
Winners of men's major golf championships
Ryder Cup competitors for the United States
World Golf Hall of Fame inductees
Golf course architects
Golf writers and broadcasters
Golfers from Charlotte, North Carolina
Golfers from Georgia (U.S. state)
People from St. Simons, Georgia
1964 births
Living people